Pune Metropolitan Region Development Authority is the planning and development authority for the Pune Metropolitan Region.

The authority covers the entire talukas of Pune, Maval, Mulshi, Haveli and parts of Bhor, Daund, Shirur, Khed, Purandar and Velhe. It has been set up as a legally empowered and a self-financing corporate body by the Urban Development Department of the Government of Maharashtra.

See also 
Pune Metropolitan Region
Mumbai Metropolitan Region Development Authority
Nagpur Metropolitan Region Development Authority

References 

State urban development authorities of India
State agencies of Maharashtra
2015 establishments in Maharashtra
Government agencies established in 2005